Sunquerim is a town on the Canara coast, in Karnataka, India.

References
The Oriental Herald, p. 15

Populated coastal places in India